HMS Curlew was an 18-gun brig-sloop of the Royal Navy, commissioned in June 1795 under Commander Francis Ventris Field for Admiral Duncan's fleet.

On 31 October 1796 she disappeared during a storm in the North Sea, and was presumed to have foundered with all hands.

Citations and references 
Citations

References
 
 
 

 

Sloops of the Royal Navy
1795 ships
Maritime incidents in 1796
Missing ships
Ships lost with all hands